Miandorud may refer to:
 Miandorud County
 Miandorud-e Bozorg Rural District
 Miandorud-e Kuchak Rural District